Jorge Silva Vieira, usually known as Jorge Vieira (18 July 1934 – 24 July 2012), was a Brazilian football player and head coach.

Career
Jorge Vieira was born in Rio de Janeiro. He won the Campeonato Carioca as América's manager, when he was 26 years old. América's line-up was Amaro, Antoninho, Nilo, Jorge, Calazans, Djalma Dias, Quarentinha, Ari, Pompéia, Ivan and Wilson Santos.

Jorge Vieira managed Belenenses, of Portugal, in 1965-66 (26 matches) and in 1966-67 (one match). In 1977, he managed Botafogo-SP, winning that year's Campeonato Paulista first stage, named Taça Cidade de São Paulo. Botafogo-SP's line-up was: Aguillera, Wilson Campos, Nei, Manoel and Mineiro; Mário, Lorico and Sócrates; Zé Mário, Arlindo and João Carlos Motoca.

Vieira managed Palmeiras in 1977 and in 1978, and in 1979, as Corinthians's manager, he, with the help of the midfielder Sócrates, who was a former Botafogo-SP player, won the Campeonato Paulista. Jorge Vieira managed Corinthians again when the club won the Campeonato Paulista 1983, replacing Mário Travaglini, who was hired by Corinthians rival São Paulo. Its rival was defeated in the competition's final. Corinthians' line-up was: Leão; Alfinete, Juninho, Mauro and Wladimir; Paulinho, Biro-Biro, Sócrates and Zenon; Casagrande and Eduardo Amorim.

He then managed several Mexican clubs, and the Iraq and El Salvador national teams. He won two league titles with Mexican side Club América.

Honors
Vieira won the Campeonato Carioca as América's manager in 1960, and won the Campeonato Paulista twice managing Corinthians in 1979 and in 1983.

References

External links
Toros Neza stats at Medio Tiemo

1934 births
2012 deaths
Footballers from Rio de Janeiro (city)
Brazilian football managers
Expatriate football managers in El Salvador
Expatriate football managers in Iraq
Expatriate football managers in Mexico
Expatriate football managers in Portugal
America Football Club (RJ) managers
CR Vasco da Gama managers
C.F. Os Belenenses managers
Galícia Esporte Clube managers
Vitória S.C. managers
Sport Club do Recife managers
Esporte Clube Bahia managers
Esporte Clube Vitória managers
América Futebol Clube (MG) managers
Botafogo Futebol Clube (SP) managers
Sociedade Esportiva Palmeiras managers
Clube Atlético Mineiro managers
Sport Club Corinthians Paulista managers
Botafogo de Futebol e Regatas managers
Associação Portuguesa de Desportos managers
Iraq national football team managers
Club América managers
Club Puebla managers
El Salvador national football team managers
Association footballers not categorized by position
Association football players not categorized by nationality